Gravimetry is the measurement of the strength of a gravitational field. Gravimetry may be used when either the magnitude of a gravitational field or the properties of matter responsible for its creation are of interest.

Units of measurement
Gravity is usually measured in units of acceleration. In the SI system of units, the standard unit of acceleration is 1 metre per second squared (abbreviated as m/s2). Other units include the cgs gal (sometimes known as a galileo, in either case with symbol Gal), which equals 1 centimetre per second squared, and the g (gn), equal to 9.80665 m/s2. The value of the gn is defined approximately equal to the acceleration due to gravity at the Earth's surface (although the value of g varies by location).

Gravimeters
An instrument used to measure gravity is known as a gravimeter. For a small body, general relativity predicts gravitational effects indistinguishable from the effects of acceleration by the equivalence principle.  Thus, gravimeters can be regarded as special-purpose accelerometers.  Many weighing scales may be regarded as simple gravimeters. In one common form, a spring is used to counteract the force of gravity pulling on an object. The change in length of the spring may be calibrated to the force required to balance the gravitational pull. The resulting measurement may be made in units of force (such as the newton), but is more commonly made in units of gals or cm/s2.

Researchers use more sophisticated gravimeters when precise measurements are needed. When measuring the Earth's gravitational field, measurements are made to the precision of microgals to find density variations in the rocks making up the Earth. Several types of gravimeters exist for making these measurements, including some that are essentially refined versions of the spring scale described above. These measurements are used to define gravity anomalies.

Besides precision, stability is also an important property of a gravimeter, as it allows the monitoring of gravity changes. These changes can be the result of mass displacements inside the Earth, or of vertical movements of the Earth's crust on which measurements are being made: remember that gravity decreases 0.03 mGal for every metre of height. The study of gravity changes belongs to geodynamics.

The majority of modern gravimeters use specially-designed metal or quartz zero-length springs to support the test mass. Zero-length springs do not follow Hooke's law; instead they have a force proportional to their length.  The special property of these springs is that the natural resonant period of oscillation of the spring–mass system can be made very long – approaching a thousand seconds. This detunes the test mass from most local vibration and mechanical noise, increasing the sensitivity and utility of the gravimeter. Quartz and metal springs are chosen for different reasons; quartz springs are less affected by magnetic and electric fields while metal springs have a much lower drift (elongation) with time. The test mass is sealed in an air-tight container so that tiny changes of barometric pressure from blowing wind and other weather do not change the buoyancy of the test mass in air.

Spring gravimeters are, in practice, relative instruments which measure the difference in gravity between different locations. A relative instrument also requires calibration by comparing instrument readings taken at locations with known complete or absolute values of gravity. Absolute gravimeters provide such measurements by determining the gravitational acceleration of a test mass in vacuum. A test mass is allowed to fall freely inside a vacuum chamber and its position is measured with a laser interferometer and timed with an atomic clock. The laser wavelength is known to ±0.025 ppb and the clock is stable to ±0.03 ppb as well. Great care must be taken to minimize the effects of perturbing forces such as
residual air resistance (even in vacuum), vibration, and magnetic forces. Such instruments are capable of an accuracy of about two parts per billion or 0.002 mGal and reference their measurement to atomic standards of length and time. Their primary use is for calibrating relative instruments, monitoring crustal deformation, and in geophysical studies requiring high accuracy and stability. However, absolute instruments are somewhat larger and significantly more expensive than relative spring gravimeters, and are thus relatively rare.

Gravimeters have been designed to mount in vehicles, including aircraft (note the field of aerogravity), ships and submarines. These special gravimeters isolate acceleration from the movement of the vehicle and subtract it from measurements. The acceleration of the vehicles is often hundreds or thousands of times stronger than the changes being measured.

A gravimeter (the Lunar Surface Gravimeter) deployed on the surface of the moon during the Apollo 17 mission did not work due to a design error. KoA second device (the Traverse Gravimeter Experiment) functioned as anticipated.

Further information

A gravimeter is an instrument used to measure gravitational acceleration. Every mass has an associated gravitational potential.  The gradient of this potential is a force.  A gravimeter measures this gravitational force.

The first gravimeters were vertical accelerometers, specialized for measuring the constant downward acceleration of gravity on the earth's surface. The earth's vertical gravity varies from place to place over the surface of the Earth by about ±0.5%.

The change from calling a device an "accelerometer" to calling it a "gravimeter" occurs at approximately the point where it has to make corrections for earth tides.

Though similar in design to other accelerometers, gravimeters are typically designed to be much more sensitive.  Their first uses were to measure the changes in gravity from the varying densities and distribution of masses inside the earth, from temporal "tidal" variations in the shape and distribution of mass in the oceans, atmosphere and earth.

Gravimeters can detect vibrations and gravity changes from human activities.  Depending on the interests of the researcher or operator, this might be counteracted by integral vibration isolation and signal processing.

The resolution of gravimeters can be increased by averaging samples over longer periods. Fundamental characteristics of gravimeters are the accuracy of a single measurement (a single "sample"), and the sampling rate (samples per second).

for example:

Gravimeters display their measurements in units of gals (cm/s2), nanometers per second squared, and parts per million, parts per billion, or parts per trillion of the average vertical acceleration with respect to the earth. Some newer units are pm/s2 (picometers per second squared), fm/s2 (femto), am/s2 (atto) for very sensitive instruments.

Gravimeters are used for petroleum and mineral prospecting, seismology, geodesy, geophysical surveys and other geophysical research, and for metrology.  Their fundamental purpose is to map the gravity field in space and time.

Most current work is earth-based, with a few satellites around earth, but gravimeters are also applicable to the moon, sun, planets, asteroids, stars, galaxies and other bodies. Gravitational wave experiments monitor the changes with time in the gravitational potential itself, rather than the gradient of the potential which the gravimeter is tracking. This distinction is somewhat arbitrary. The subsystems of the gravitational radiation experiments are very sensitive to changes in the gradient of the potential. The local gravity signals on earth that interfere with gravitational wave experiments are disparagingly referred to as "Newtonian noise", since Newtonian gravity calculations are sufficient to characterize many of the local (earth-based) signals.

The term absolute gravimeter has most often been used to label gravimeters which report the local vertical acceleration due to the earth. Relative gravimeter usually refer to differential comparisons of gravity from one place to another. They are designed to subtract the average vertical gravity automatically. They can be calibrated at a location where the gravity is known accurately, and then transported to the location where the gravity is to be measured. Or they can calibrated in absolute units at their operating location.

There are many methods for displaying acceleration fields, also called gravity fields. This includes traditional 2D maps, but increasingly 3D video.  Since gravity and acceleration are the same, "acceleration field" might be preferable, since "gravity" is an oft misused prefix.

Commercial absolute gravimeters

Gravimeters for measuring the earth's gravity as precisely as possible are getting smaller and more portable. A common type measures the acceleration of small masses free falling in a vacuum, when the accelerometer is firmly attached to the ground. The mass includes a retroreflector and terminates one arm of a Michelson interferometer. By counting and timing the interference fringes, the acceleration of the mass can be measured.  A more recent development is a "rise and fall" version that tosses the mass upward and measures both upward and downward motion.  This allows cancellation of some measurement errors; however, "rise and fall" gravimeters are not yet in common use. Absolute gravimeters are used in the calibration of relative gravimeters, surveying for gravity anomalies (voids), and for establishing the vertical control network.

Atom interferometric and atomic fountain methods are used for precise measurement of the earth's gravity, and atomic clocks and purpose-built instruments can use time dilation (also called general relativistic) measurements to track changes in the gravitational potential and gravitational acceleration on the earth.

The term "absolute" does not convey the instrument's stability, sensitivity, accuracy, ease of use, and bandwidth.  So it and "relative" should not be used when more specific characteristics can be given.

Relative gravimeters
The most common gravimeters are spring-based. They are used in gravity surveys over large areas for establishing the figure of the geoid over those areas. They are basically a weight on a spring, and by measuring the amount by which the weight stretches the spring, local gravity can be measured. However, the strength of the spring must be calibrated by placing the instrument in a location with a known gravitational acceleration.

The current standard for sensitive gravimeters are the superconducting gravimeters, which operate by suspending a superconducting niobium sphere in an extremely stable magnetic field; the current required to generate the magnetic field that suspends the niobium sphere is proportional to the strength of the Earth's gravitational acceleration. In a demonstration of the sensitivity of the superconducting gravimeter, Virtanen (2006), describes how an instrument at Metsähovi, Finland, detected the gradual increase in surface gravity as workmen cleared snow from its laboratory roof.

The largest component of the signal recorded by a superconducting gravimeter is the tidal gravity of the sun and moon acting at the station. "SGs", as they are called, can detect and characterize earth tides, changes in the density of the atmosphere, the effect of changes in the shape of the surface of the ocean, the effect of the atmosphere's pressure on the earth, changes in the rate of rotation of the earth, oscillations of the earth's core, distant and nearby seismic events, and more.

Many broadband, three axis, seismometers in common use are sensitive enough to track the sun and moon.  When operated to report acceleration, they are useful gravimeters. Because they have three axes, it is possible to solve for their position and orientation, by either tracking the arrival time and pattern of seismic waves from earthquakes, or by referencing them to the sun and moon tidal gravity.

Recently, the SGs, and broadband three axis seismometers operated in gravimeter mode, have begun to detect and characterize the small gravity signals from earthquakes. These signals arrive at the gravimeter at the speed of light, so have the potential to improve earthquake early warning methods. There is some activity to design purpose-built gravimeters of sufficient sensitivity and bandwidth to detect these prompt gravity signals from earthquakes. Not just the magnitude 7+ events, but also the smaller, much more frequent, events.

Newer MEMS gravimeters, atom gravimeters – MEMS gravimeters offer the potential for low cost arrays of sensors. MEMS gravimeters are currently variations on spring type accelerometers where the motions of a tiny cantilever or mass are tracked to report acceleration.  Much of the research is focussed on different methods of detecting the position and movements of these small masses. In Atom gravimeters, the mass is a collection of atoms.

For a given restoring force, the central frequency of the instrument is often given by

 (in radians per second)

The term for the "force constant" changes if the restoring force is electrostatic, magnetostatic, electromagnetic, optical, microwave, acoustic, or any of dozens of different ways to keep the mass stationary. The "force constant" is just the coefficient of the displacement term in the equation of motion:

m mass, a acceleration, b viscosity, v velocity, k force constant, x displacement
F external force as a function of location/position and time.

 + higher derivatives of the restoring force

Precise GPS stations can be operated as gravimeters since they are increasingly measuring three axis positions over time, which, when differentiated twice, give an acceleration signal.

The satellite borne gravimeters GOCE, GRACE, are mostly operating in gravity gradiometer mode.  They yield detailed information about the earth's time varying gravity field  The spherical harmonic gravitational potential models are slowly improving in both spatial and temporal resolution.  Taking the gradient of the potentials gives estimate of local acceleration which are what is measured by the gravimeter arrays. The superconducting gravimeter network has been used to ground truth the satellite potentials. This should eventually improve both the satellite and earth-based methods and intercomparisons.

Transportable relative gravimeters also exist; they employ an extremely stable inertial platform to compensate for the masking effects of motion and vibration, a difficult engineering feat. The first transportable relative gravimeters were, reportedly, a secret military technology developed in the 1950–1960s as a navigational aid for nuclear submarines. Subsequently in the 1980s, transportable relative gravimeters were reverse engineered by the civilian sector for use on ship, then in air and finally satellite borne gravity surveys.

Microgravimetry
Microgravimetry is an important branch developed on the foundation of classical gravimetry.  Microgravity investigations are carried out in order to solve various problems of engineering geology, mainly location of voids and their monitoring. Very detailed measurements of high accuracy can indicate voids of any origin, provided the size and depth are large enough to produce gravity effect stronger than is the level of confidence of relevant gravity signal.

History

The modern gravimeter was developed by Lucien LaCoste and Arnold Romberg in 1936.

They also invented most subsequent refinements, including the ship-mounted gravimeter, in 1965, temperature-resistant instruments for deep boreholes, and lightweight hand-carried instruments.  Most of their designs remain in use with refinements in data collection and data processing.

Satellite gravimetry

Currently, the static and time-variable Earth's gravity field parameters are being determined using modern satellite missions, such as GOCE, CHAMP, Swarm, GRACE and GRACE-FO. The lowest-degree parameters, including the Earth's oblateness and geocenter motion are best determined from Satellite laser ranging.

Large-scale gravity anomalies can be detected from space, as a by-product of satellite gravity missions, e.g., GOCE. These satellite missions aim at the recovery of a detailed gravity field model of the Earth, typically presented in the form of a spherical-harmonic expansion of the Earth's gravitational potential, but alternative presentations, such as maps of geoid undulations or gravity anomalies, are also produced.

The Gravity Recovery and Climate Experiment (GRACE) consists of two satellites that can detect gravitational changes across the Earth. Also these changes can be presented as gravity anomaly temporal variations. The Gravity Recovery and Interior Laboratory (GRAIL) also consisted of two spacecraft orbiting the Moon, which orbited for three years before their deorbit in 2015.

See also

Gravity Field and Steady-State Ocean Circulation Explorer (GOCE) A modern satellite-borne gradiometer containing pairs of gravimeters (accelerometers), launched March 2009

GRACE and GRACE-FO, spacecraft launched March 2002

References

 
Geodesy